The 2013–14 season was Oud-Heverlee Leuven's 12th competitive season in professional football and the team's third season in the Belgian Pro League. After struggling the whole season, OH Leuven ended 15th in the league and was forced to play the relegation playoffs against Mons. They did get past Mons but were eventually relegated as they did not manage to win the Belgian Second Division Final Round. OH Leuven also had a mediocre cup run, struggling past Belgian Second Division team Visé before falling 3-0 to Gent.

Season Overview

Pre-season
Not counting defender Zainoul Haidara, who had already signed a contract during the winter 2012–13 transfer window to join the club for the coming season, OHL announces its first signing for the new season with David Wijns, coming from Kortrijk. Wijns is a 26-year-old Belgian defender born in Leuven who played most of his career with Heist, helping the team move up two divisions into the Belgian Second Division before joining Kortrijk.

In the beginning of June, former Belgian international Kevin Roelandts, who was out on loan to Antwerp, signs for Maldegem and thus permanently leaves OH Leuven. Just a few days later, the Belgian Pro League fixtures for the 2013–14 season are announced on June 10. Oud-Heverlee Leuven opens the season with an away match to Kortrijk on 27 July 2013. Just like the previous season, Genk will be the first opponent to come and play at Den Dreef on matchday 2.

Just like Roelandts two weeks before, Nicky Hayen also leaves the club after a loan spell at Antwerp. Hayen becomes player-coach at Belgian Third Division team Dender EH.

First goalkeeper Logan Bailly, who had only recently signed a contract extension in December 2012, prolongs his contract again by two years on June 18, keeping him in Leuven until 2016. Two days later, OHL signs 29-year-old Belgian midfielder Mohamed Messoudi from Gent. Near the end of June yet another player out on loan leaves the club, when striker Christian Pouga, who was out on loan to Lierse, signs for Turkish team Ankaraspor in the Turkish Second Division.

In July, the team is very active on the transfer market, starting with four transfers occurring in the beginning of the month, with both Frederik Boi (to Cercle Brugge), Jonas De Roeck (to Antwerp) and Koen Weuts (to Helmond Sport) leaving the club, while Tom Pettersson is announced as a new player, arriving on loan from Åtvidabergs. OH Leuven states that they have also obtained a clause to activate a permanent transfer of the 23-year-old Swedish defender. One week later, three more incoming transfers are announced, as OHL brings in two international players, Belgian Marvin Ogunjimi and Bosnian Muhamed Subašić, both on loan respectively from Mallorca and Olimpic Sarajevo, together with a second Brazilian player Douglas Maia, who was a free agent. At the same time, OHL sees another two players depart the club, as striker Chuka and defender Tomislav Mikulić seek new challenges. Chuka has been with the team for two seasons, scoring many goals, while Mikulić had helped out to strengthen the defence during the last 6 months. Chuka moves to CFR Cluj, while Mikulić moves to Panthrakikos. The stream of transfers is interrupted by the news that wingback Günther Vanaudenaerde has fractured his tibia during the friendly against Heerenveen and will be out for at least three months. To replace this loss, OH Leuven signs international Bulgarian wingback Ivan Bandalovski, while youngsters Loris Brogno and Christopher Verbist are loaned out to second division team Lommel United to get more first team experience.

August
OHL suffers a bad start to the season, scoring only one point out of the first four matches, drawing away to newly promoted Oostende.

First team squad
As of 31 August 2013. OHL Team 2013–14

Transfers

In

Summer

Loan In

Summer

Out

Summer

Loan Out

Summer

Club

Coaching staff
{|class="wikitable"
!Position
!Staff
|-
|-
|Head Coach|| Ronny Van Geneugden
|-
|rowspan=2|Assistant First Team Coach|| Arnold Rijsenburg
|-
| Hans Vander Elst 
|-
|Goalkeeping coach|| Jurgen De Braekeleer

Other information

Competitions

Friendly matches

Pre-season

During the season

Belgian Pro League

OHL's third season in the Belgian Pro League began on 27 July 2013.

League table

Results summary

Points breakdown

Points at home: 24 
Points away from home: 3 
Points against 2012/13 Playoff 1 teams (6): 10 (27.78%)
Points against 2012/13 Playoff 2 teams (7): 12 (28.57%)
Points against 2012/13 Playoff 3 teams (1): 4 (75%)
Points against newly promoted teams (1): 1 (16.67%)

6 points: none
4 points: Cercle Brugge, Lierse
3 points: Anderlecht, Lokeren, Waasland-Beveren, Zulte Waregem
2 points: none
1 point: Charleroi, Gent, Kortrijk, Mechelen, Mons, Oostende, Standard
0 points: Club Brugge, Genk

Biggest & smallest

Biggest home win: 3–0 vs. Cercle Brugge
Biggest home defeat: 2–5 vs. Club Brugge; 1–4 vs. Genk
Biggest away win: none
Biggest away defeat: 0–3 vs. Genk

Biggest home attendance: 9,493 vs. Club Brugge and vs. Anderlecht
Smallest home attendance: 7,613 vs. Charleroi
Biggest away attendance: 23,751 vs. Standard Liège
Smallest away attendance: 3,850 vs. Mons

Results by round

Relegation Playoff & Second Division Final Round
After finishing 15th during the regular season, OHL was forced to play the Relegation Playoff together with Mons. OHL started with a three-point head start and home advantage. After winning twice at home and drawing away, OHL had obtained an unattainable lead, causing Mons to be relegated. Meanwhile, OHL thereby won the right to play the Second Division Final Round which they needed to win to remain in the Belgian Pro League.

Final round table

List of matches

Belgian Cup

References

External links
 

2013-14
Belgian football clubs 2013–14 season
Oud-Heverlee Leuven seasons